Bet Mishpachah (House of Family; Hebrew: בית משפחה) is a Jewish egalitarian worshiping community in the Dupont Circle area of Washington, D.C. It is one of a number of national and international Jewish communities of "LGBT affirming congregations" that specifically welcome and "embrace" the LGBT (Lesbian, Gay, Bisexual, and Transgender) community, along with all others who "wish to participate in an inclusive, egalitarian, and mutually supportive community." Membership is open to all singles, couples, and families, regardless of religious affiliation, sexual orientation, or gender identity.

Sabbath worship services and most religious and educational programs are held at the Washington, D.C. Jewish Community Center (DCJCC).

History
Bet Mishpachah was founded in 1975, as the Metropolitan Community Temple Mishpocheh. At first, its members were all men, but it later had woman as members too. In 1976, it hosted the First International Conference of Gay & Lesbian Jews, which was organized in response to the United Nations resolution equating Zionism with racism, in an effort to create a forum for communications and mutual support among gay and lesbian Jews. Bet Mishpachah was incorporated on July 26, 1977.

In 1978, the congregation elected members of its Board of Directors and began holding weekly worship services, using rented spaces in Washington, D.C. The following year, the congregation received a Torah scroll, rescued from The Holocaust, on permanent loan from the Westminster Synagogue in London. The scroll (a Sefer Torah, in Hebrew) once belonged to a small 500-year-old Jewish community in Dolní Kounice, a town destroyed in 1940, in the former Czechoslovakia.

In 1980, the congregation formally adopted its present name, Bet Mishpachah, "House of Family", and co-founded the World Congress of Gay & Lesbian Jews at the Third International Conference of Gay & Lesbian Jews, in San Francisco, California. At the time, Bet Mishpachah had 80 members. Its services, led by lay leadership, were held in the basement of a United Methodist church called Christ Church. In 1985, the congregation hosted the Ninth International Conference of the World Congress of Gay & Lesbian Jews.

In the 1980s and early 1990s, Bet Mishpachah lost several of its members to AIDS. The congregation decided it needed to hired its first rabbi, in part in order to help with the pastoral needs of members with partners who were terminal or had died. Rabbi Robert Saks was hired as their first rabbi, on a part-time basis, in 1991. 

In 1991, Bet Mishpachah purchased its second Torah scroll. Like the first one, this was an historic scroll. It was written in 1917 in Czarist Russia, but never mounted on Etzei Chaim, the wooden poles to which the parchment is attached, and never used in synagogue services.

Also in 1991, the synagogue published its own siddur, prayerbook, for Sabbath/Shabbat and festivals. The siddur's text included mentioned both women and men, and it included a gender-neutral word for God. For example, in the siddur, the Amidah, an important prayer in every Jewish service, refers to avot v'Imahot (fathers and mothers) rather than only avot (fathers). Bet Mishpachah's 1991 prayerbook used the egalitarian , or fathers and mothers.  In 1992, a second prayerbook, Ti'filot Nachumim (Prayers of Consolation), was created for use during shiva worship—special prayers during the first week following the death of a loved one, and memorial services.

In 1997, the congregation moved to the newly restored and reopened Washington, D.C. Jewish Community Center (closed since 1968). The following year, 1998, work was completed on a special five-volume High Holy Days machzor, prayerbook, "Chadeish Yameinu" ("Renew Our Days").

In 1998, the congregation hosted the Eighth Eastern Regional Conference of the World Congress of GLBT Jews. By 1999, Bet Mishpachah had over 300 members of the congregation. In 2000, it engaged its second rabbi, again on a part-time basis, Rabbi Leila Gal Berner. Rabbi Berner remained with the congregation through 2004.

In 2009, Rabbi Saks retired and became the rabbi emeritus of the congregation. That same year, Rabbi Toby Manewith began serving as rabbi. In 2013, Rabbi Laurie Green replaced Toby Manewith as rabbi. In 2019, Rabbi Laurie Green moved to Chicago, and Rabbi Jake Singer-Beilin replaced her as rabbi of Bet Mishapachah.

In 2015, the congregation revised its siddur, in order to be inclusive of all people including those who are non-binary. For example, in the revised siddur, the Amidah refers to a term without gender, dorot (generations), rather than avot v'Imahot (fathers and mothers). The new siddur also includes several readings with themes of inclusivity and a passage about World AIDS Day.

In March 2022, Joshua Maxey, a Jew of Color, was hired as Bet Mishpachah's first Executive Director.

The congregation has also started a cemetery called Bet Mishpachah Cemetery, located in Congress Heights.

Worship, education, and special events
The congregation is known as a "House of Family"—a place of "homecoming"—true to its name. Programs offer opportunities for education, celebration, social interaction—including home hospitality, and in cooperation with other local, national, and international organizations, opportunities to promote freedom, faith, social justice, and human rights.

However, at the heart of congregational activities are worship services. As of 2010, Friday evening Sabbath Eve services are held weekly and Saturday morning Sabbath services are held on the 2nd and 4th Saturdays of each month, at the Washington, D.C. Jewish Community Center. At special times, such as the High Holy Days, when larger spaces are needed, services are held elsewhere in the Washington, D.C. area.

Music is an integral element of Bet Mishpachah, and its choir, Tach'shitim (Jewels), originally formed as a trio in the 1980s, has added to worship services and special events for the congregation, and has also been featured in Jewish and interfaith services and concerts at other settings within the D.C. and Baltimore areas. Additionally, the choir released the recording, "Family and Friends," in 2000, and in 2004 it participated in the 7th International GALA Choruses Festival, in Montreal, Quebec, Canada. The choir was also featured in the 2006 documentary, "Why We Sing."

Leadership for individual worship services is rotated between lay leaders, Rabbi Jake Singer-Beilin, and occasional guest rabbis.

Networking and goals
Bet Mishpachah is an active partner with organizations within the LGBT Jewish community, the LGBT community of all faiths, and the larger Jewish community. It is a founding member of Keshet Ga’avah - the World Congress of GLBTQ Jews and a close partner with the Kurlander Program for GLBTQ Outreach & Engagement at the Edlavitch DCJCC.  It is a participating member of the Network of Independent Jewish Communities & Havurot, administered by The Am Kolel Jewish Renewal Community of Greater Washington; the Jewish Funeral Practices Committee of Greater Washington; and the Jewish Community Relations Council (JCRC) of Greater Washington.

Keshet Ga'avah
The participation of Bet Mishpachah in Keshet Ga'avah, the World Congress of GLBTQ Jews, is an especially important and ongoing effort, to create a structure of networking among national and international communities, including those in Israel, and to promote the organization's vision of "an environment where Lesbian, Gay, Bisexual, and Transgender Jews worldwide can enjoy free and fulfilling lives." In support of that vision, it seeks to:
 be the worldwide voice of LGBT Jews
 support, inspire, and strengthen local groups
 foster a sense of community among diverse individuals and organizations
 and, to achieve equality and security for LGBT Jews worldwide.

To achieve these goals, the organization's guiding principles are to value, promote, and support:
 diversity among groups and individuals;
 self-determination and respect for the autonomy of local organizations and individuals;
 transparent organizational structure; and
 close ties between LGBT Israelis and LGBT Jews around the world.

Center Faith
In addition to Bet Mishpachah's support to the larger LGBT Jewish community and to be part of LGBT interfaith efforts is support to Center Faith and participation in the Capital Pride Interfaith Service.

Awards
In 2010, the congregation received the Mautner Project Healing Works Award.

See also
 LGBT matters and religion
 LGBT rights in the United States
 LGBT-affirming religious groups
 Ordination of LGBT clergy in Judaism
 LGBT topics and Judaism
 Film, "Trembling Before G-d" (Documentary about LGBT Orthodox Jews.)
 Queer: reclaiming of a still sometimes controversial term

References

External links
 Bet Mishpachah—Jewish Information and Referral Service (JIRS) listing.
 Website for Nehirm:Jewish Culture and Spirituality.
 Institute for Judaism and Sexual Orientation of Hebrew Union College (Reform Judaism)
 News article: Washington GLBT Jewish Congregation Selects New Rabbi as it Enters New Era.

LGBT culture in Washington, D.C.
LGBT synagogues in the United States
Synagogues in Washington, D.C.